Precambrian Research is a peer-reviewed scientific journal covering the geology of the Earth and its planetary neighbors. It is published by Elsevier and, the editors-in-chief are V. Pease (Stockholm University) and G.C. Zhao (University of Hong Kong). It was established in 1974. According to the Journal Citation Reports, the journal has a 2013 impact factor of 6.023.

References

External links 
 
 

Geology journals
Elsevier academic journals
English-language journals
Publications established in 1974